The Assistant Postmaster General is a defunct junior ministerial position in the United Kingdom Government.

The title of Postmaster General was abolished under the Post Office Act 1969. A new public authority governed by a chairman was established under the name of the "Post Office".
The position of "Postmaster General" was replaced with Minister of Posts and Telecommunications and that of Assistant Postmaster General was replaced by a Parliamentary Secretary post.

Assistant Postmasters General

January 1910: Henry Norman
1910: Cecil Norton
1915: Herbert Pike Pease
1922: vacant
1924: Viscount Wolmer
1929: Samuel Viant
1931: Graham White
1932: Sir Ernest Bennett
1935: Sir Walter Womersley
1939: William Mabane
1939: Charles Waterhouse
1941: Allan Chapman
1942: Robert Grimston
1945: William Anstruther-Gray
1945: Wilfrid Burke
1947: Charles Rider Hobson
1951: Leonard David Gammans
1955: Cuthbert Alport
1957: Kenneth Thompson
1959: Mervyn Pike
1963: Raymond Llewellyn Mawby
1964: Joseph Slater

Parliamentary Secretaries to the Minister of Posts and Telecommunications

1969: Joseph Slater
1969: Norman Pentland

Lists of government ministers of the United Kingdom
Defunct ministerial offices in the United Kingdom